Ali Biçim (born 17 April 1987) is a Turkish actor and influencer.

Television programs

Filmography

Discography

Single 
 "Yanmayalım Mı Ertan" (2020)

Other works

References 

People from İzmit
1987 births
Living people
Beykent University alumni
Turkish male film actors
Turkish male television actors
Turkish television presenters
Turkish stand-up comedians
Turkish YouTubers